Vokesimurex olssoni is a species of sea snail, a marine gastropod mollusk in the family Muricidae, the murex snails or rock snails.

References

Gastropods described in 1967
Vokesimurex